The Rich and the Rest of Us: A Poverty Manifesto is a 2012 political, non-fiction book written by Tavis Smiley and Cornel West. The book examines poverty in America and how to eliminate it.

References

External links

Books about economic inequality
Books about politics of the United States
Books by Cornel West
2012 non-fiction books
Political books
Black studies publications
Collaborative non-fiction books